Bernardino Cesari (1571 – 30 June 1622) was an Italian painter of the late-Mannerist and early Baroque period, active mainly in Rome and Naples, where he assisted his brother Giuseppe Cesari (Cavaliere d'Arpino).

On 9 November 1592, he was sentenced to death, for consorting with bandits, and fled to Naples. On 13 May 1593, he was pardoned and returned to Rome. In 1616, he travelled with Giuseppe to Naples to assist in painting in the Certosa di San Martino, then to Piedimonte di Alife to paint a large Last Judgement in the chapel of the fathers "predicatori". He travelled to Monte Cassino where he laboured with Giuseppe in the frescoes for the refectory and the stanza of San Benedict, then to Rome where he painted an oil canvas of Noli me tangere, a fresco of Constantine the Great, a St. Peter, and three oil paintings for the church Santi Cosma e Damiano.

Works

Destruction of Niobe's Children
Hannibal's Defeat by Scipio Africanus
Noli me tangere
Persephone and Andromeda
St. Peter, Santi Cosma e Damiano
St. Cecilia
Diana and Acteon
Sts. Stephen and Agatha
A fresco of Constantine the Great
Paintings at Certosa di San Martino, Naples

References

Bibliography
His biography is collected in Giovanni Baglione's Vite. p. 139.

1565 births
1621 deaths
People from the Province of Frosinone
16th-century Italian painters
Italian male painters
17th-century Italian painters
Painters from Naples
Italian Baroque painters
Italian Mannerist painters